Species belonging to the genus Amaranthus have been cultivated for their grains for 8,000 years. Amaranth plants are classified as pseudocereals that are grown for their edible starchy seeds, but they are not in the same botanical family as true cereals, such as wheat and rice. Amaranth species that are still used as a grain are Amaranthus caudatus L., Amaranthus cruentus L., and Amaranthus hypochondriacus L. The yield of grain amaranth is comparable to that of rice or maize.

The grain was a staple food of the Aztecs and an integral part of Aztec religious ceremonies. The cultivation of amaranth was banned by the conquistadores upon their conquest of the Aztec nation. However, the plant has grown as a weed since then, so its genetic base has been largely maintained. Research on grain amaranth began in the United States in the 1970s. By the end of the 1970s, a few thousand acres were being cultivated there, and continue to be cultivated.

Much of the amaranth grain currently grown is sold in health food shops. Grain amaranth is also grown as a food crop in limited areas of Mexico, where it is used to make a candy called alegría (Spanish for joy) at festival times. In other preparations, the grain can be popped like popcorn and then either mixed with honey, or served with milk, dried fruit and nuts like a cold breakfast cereal. Amaranth grain can also be used to extract amaranth oil, a pressed seed oil with commercial uses.

Nutritional analysis

Raw amaranth grain is inedible to humans and cannot be digested because it blocks the absorption of nutrients. Thus it has to be prepared and cooked like other grains. In a  amount, cooked amaranth provides  of food energy and is a moderately rich source of dietary minerals, including phosphorus, manganese, and iron. Cooked amaranth is 75% water, 19% carbohydrates, 4% protein, and 2% fat (table).

According to Educational Concerns for Hunger Organization (ECHO), amaranth leaves are nutritious, and "amounts of
vitamin C, iron, beta carotene, calcium, folic acid and protein are especially high," however, amaranth leaves contain anti-nutritional factors, including oxalates, nitrates, saponins, and phenolic compounds. Cooking methods such as boiling the leaves in water and then discarding the water may reduce toxic effects. The report also cites a study indicating that "research has shown that consumption of 200 grams of cooked amaranth poses no health problems."

Amaranth grain is high in protein and lysine, an amino acid found in low quantities in other grains. According to the FAO, amaranth grain as a source of protein is "superior in content and quality to traditional cereals." Amaranth grain is deficient in essential amino acids such as leucine and threonine – both of which are present in wheat germ. Amaranth grain is free of gluten, which makes it a viable grain for people with gluten intolerance.

The table below presents nutritional values of cooked, edible form of amaranth grain to cooked, edible form of wheat grain.

Cultivation 

There are about 75 species in the genus Amaranthus. Many species of amaranth grain are hardy plants, showing resistance to changes in pH, salt content, environment, temperature, and drought. Amaranth grains have genetic diversity and adaptive ability.

Some examples of Amaranth species are Amaranthus albus, Amaranthus blitoides, Amaranthus hybridus, Amaranthus palmeri, Amaranthus powellii, Amaranthus retroflexus, Amaranthus spinosus, Amaranthus tuberculatus, and Amaranthus viridis. Amaranthus retroflexus, "pigweed," is a wild amaranth species native to the United States and is considered a weed in the Northeast, Nebraska and Great Plains, South, and West. The name derives from the plant's tendency to sprout where hogs are pasture-fed. Although both its leaves and its seeds are edible, pigweed amaranth has not been cultivated as a food crop.

Cultural uses 

The Aztecs cultivated amaranth as a staple grain crop in what is now Mexico during the pre-Columbian period. Amaranth was used by the Aztecs for tamales, tortillas, and atole (hot cereal). In addition they formed shaped images of their gods with amaranth, agave, and maize during the sacred month of Huitzilopochtli. At the end of the month, the statues were eaten by the families to "take the god into them". When the Spanish prohibited religious acts like this, and imposed the religion of their God who was worshiped through wheat, amaranth cultivation decreased. In current Mexican culture on the Day of the Dead, amaranth seeds are offered as snack foods for the spirits. Edible skulls were historically made with amaranth seeds, although today they are made out of sugar.

Gallery

References

Crops originating from Pre-Columbian North America
Crops originating from Mexico
Amaranthus
Pseudocereals